The CECAFA Club Cup is a football club tournament organised by CECAFA. It has been known as the Kagame Interclub Cup since 2002, when Rwandan President Paul Kagame began sponsoring the competition. It is contested by clubs from East and Central Africa.

History
The tournament began in 1967, in which Lamba Lamba came out champions, but was not officially recognised. The competition was halted until 1974, where Mikia became the first official champions of the tournament.

Previous winners

Finals

Notes

A.  The tournament was not officially recognised.

B.  The tournament was halted.

C.  Score was 0−0 after 90 minutes and extra time. Kampala won the shootout 3−2.

D.  Score was 2−2 after 90 minutes and extra time. Al-Merreikh won the shootout 4−2.

E.  The tournament was not held.

F.  Score was 1−1 after 90 minutes and extra time. Simba won the shootout 5−4.

G.  Score was 1−1 after 90 minutes and extra time. Simba won the shootout 5−3.

H.  Score was 1−1 after 90 minutes and extra time. Young Africans won the shootout 4−1.

I.  Score was 0−0 after 90 minutes and extra time. Tusker won the shootout 3−0.

Winners and runners-up

1 Includes titles as Abaluhya2 Includes titles as Luo Union.

By nation

See also
 CECAFA Cup
 CECAFA Nile Basin Cup

http://mysoccer24.com/category/cecafa/

 
Sport in East Africa
CECAFA competitions
International club association football competitions in Africa